KHRD (103.1 FM, "Red 103.1") is a commercial radio station in Redding, California, broadcasting to the Redding, California and Red Bluff, California areas.

KHRD airs a classic rock music format.

Dave Tappan is the current morning show host. Ryan O'Brien hosts middays from 10:00-3:00, and Eddie Valdez does afternoons from 3:00-6:00.

Station programming features include The Double Shot Weekend, The Double Shot Lunch, Dumbass of the Day as well as a weekly featured artist.

KHRD listeners (who are known as "Red Heads") are passionate about classic rock and can be heard on-air and at station events shouting "Red Rocks" as a tribute to their favorite station.

History
KHRD has aired numerous music formats, making attempts at both country music and heavy metal music through the years.

The country station was called B-103.1 and 93.3, and its call letters were KAWX.

In 2006, KHRD went to an "all" classic rock format and this has proved to a successful move as ratings and revenue have increased since the format switch.

Translators
KHRD broadcasts on the following translator:

External links
KHRD official website

HRD
Classic rock radio stations in the United States
Redding, California
Weaverville, California
Radio stations established in 1999
1999 establishments in California